Boy Cutting Grass with a Sickle is a watercolor painting created in 1881 by Vincent van Gogh. It is owned by the Kröller-Müller Museum.

References

See also
Early works of Vincent van Gogh
Paintings of Children (Van Gogh series)

1881 paintings
Paintings by Vincent van Gogh
Watercolor paintings